Shorea resinosa (called, along with some other species in the genus Shorea, white meranti) is a species of plant in the family Dipterocarpaceae. It is a tree found in Sumatra, Peninsular Malaysia and Borneo.

References

resinosa
Trees of Borneo
Trees of Peninsular Malaysia
Trees of Sumatra
Critically endangered flora of Asia
Taxonomy articles created by Polbot